Rubin Steiner (born Frédérick Landier, Tours) is a French guitar, bass, and keyboard musician, and disc jockey specialising in electronica.

He worked as a radio presenter between 1992 and 2002 for Radio béton in Tours, with a programme of free jazz, electro, punk, and experimental music.

He organized concerts in Tours, edited a music fanzine, and was a guitarist in the group Merz from 1996 to 1998.

His main influences are jazz, hip hop, punk rock, 1980s American music and pop, which he arranges into albums of electro-jazz, electronica, krautrock, pop, punk disco, post-punk, house music, and techno.

Chronology 

1999–2000 A bootleg sampler with Placido (of de Loo & Placido), then concerts with Placido, Boulez Republic, Horn Pusher, Volvo Traxx, and Francois Pirault under the name of Dance Hall Music Show.

2000–2001: Going solo with samplers and synthesizer, with videos by VJ François Pirault.

2001–2003: Samples, guitar, and singing in a quartet with Sylvestre Perrusson (bass), Benoit Louette (trombone), and François Pirault as VJ.

2003–2008: Played guitar, samples, synthesizer, and singing in a new quartet, Rubin Steiner Neue Band, with Boogers (drums), Olivier Claveau (guitar, trumpet, trombone), and Sylvestre Perrusson (bass).

2008–2009: Formed Neue Band with Lionel Laquerrière of Nestor Is Bianca, replacing Sylvestre Perrusson on bass.

2009: Recorded an album with the post-punk group The Finkielkrauts (released 2010 on Another Records [sic]).

2010: Made an old school hip hop album with Canadian rapper Ira Lee. Their title "Gay & Proud" was used as the official song of Gay Pride 2011 in Tours.

2010: Participated in Nublu Orchestra performance , conducted by Butch Morris.

Since 2010 he has played with Olivier Claveau, Lionel Laquerrière, and Yann Dupeux in Rubin Steiner & The Simple Machines, using only analog synthesizers and rhythm boxes.

He has also continued as the programme planner of Le Temps Machine, playing in Tours.

Discography

Albums 
 1998 Lo-fi nu jazz (autoprod)
 2000 Lo-fi nu jazz vol.2 (Platinum records)
 2001 Lo-fi nu jazz vol.2 + remixes (Platinum records)
 2002 Wunderbar drei (Platinum records)
 2003 Test recordings (Platinum records)
 2005 Drum Major (Platinum records)
 2008 Weird hits, two covers & a love song (Platinum records)
 2009 More weird hits (Platinum records)
 2010 Play With The Tapes #1 (Platinum records)
 2011 We are the future (Platinum records) (With IRA Lee)
 2012 Discipline In Anarchy (Platinum records)

Remixes 
 2001 Inséparable mais by Arthur H
 2001 Chépa by Ivan Hio
 2001 Le disco chinois by Julien Ribot
 2001 Donkey Racing by Mr Neveux
 2001 Satellite by Bosco
 2002 ? by Nestor Is Bianca
 2002 Les Poupons / B.O. by François de Roubaix
 2004 ? by Bless
 2004 You/You by Boogers
 2005 Oscar De La Hoya by Capt'ain K.Verne
 2006 Move by Dillinger Girl & Baby Face Nelson
 2007 7 tracks by Bikini Machine
 2009 Target by Fortune
 2010 Push It To The Limit by Bosco, remix by The Motherbeepers (Rubin Steiner, Ira Lee & Funken)
 2010 Eagles don't Sparkle by We Are Enfant Terrible
 2010 Brothers & Sisters by Unison
 2010 I'm not John Mc Entire by Kid Francescoli
 2012 Eagles don't Sparkle by We Are Enfant Terrible
 2012 Future Echo by The Oscillation
 2012 Cum Operated by Jerri

Maxis and EPs 
 1999 Easy Tune ep (UHS)
 2001 Midi Jazz 7" (Platinum records)
 2001 New Bossa 7" (Platinum records)
 2001 Tango 7" (Platinum records)
 2002 Guitarlandia Remixes remix by Bosco, Mr Neveux, Up, Bustel & Out, Dj Vadim, TTC, Mr Quark (Platinum records)
 2003 Test Recordings vol.1  (Platinum records)
 2005 Your life is like a Tony Conrad Concert (Platinum records)
 2008 Take Your Time (Platinum records)
 2012 Dexter (Platinum records)

Other 
 2002 Camping Car for Camping Car - Rubin Steiner & Mme Douze (Travaux publics)
 2004 Oumupo 3 with Luz (Ici, d'ailleurs...)
 Compilations on the Travaux publics label

References
 

1974 births
Living people